Alexey Viktorovich Dergunov (born 16 September 1984) is a Kazakhstani sprint canoer who won a gold and a silver medal in doubles (K-2 200 m and 1000 m) at the 2014 Asian Games. Earlier at the 2008 Summer Olympics he was eliminated in the semifinals of the K-2 500 m event (with Dmitry Kaltenberger).  At the 2012 Summer Olympics, competing with Yevgeny Alekseyev, he was knocked out in the first round of the K-2 200 m but reached the semifinals of the K-2 1000 m. At the 2016 Rio Games he failed to reach the finals of the K-1 200 m and K-2 1000 m events.

Dergunov took up kayaking in 1996. He has a degree in physical education from West Kazakhstan State University. He is married to Natalia and has a son Nikon.

References

1984 births
Canoeists at the 2008 Summer Olympics
Canoeists at the 2012 Summer Olympics
Canoeists at the 2016 Summer Olympics
Kazakhstani male canoeists
Living people
People from Oral, Kazakhstan
Olympic canoeists of Kazakhstan
Kazakhstani people of Russian descent
Asian Games medalists in canoeing
Canoeists at the 2010 Asian Games
Canoeists at the 2014 Asian Games
Asian Games gold medalists for Kazakhstan
Asian Games silver medalists for Kazakhstan
Medalists at the 2014 Asian Games
Medalists at the 2010 Asian Games
Canoeists at the 2018 Asian Games
Medalists at the 2018 Asian Games
21st-century Kazakhstani people